The Land Reform Museum (LRM) is a museum located in Songshan District, Taipei, Taiwan. The purpose of the museum is to commemorate the land reform in Taiwan in the 1950s.

History
The museum was established on 11 March 1967.

Collection
Exhibitions include historical land reform documents including land reform campaign literature, charts, and photographs.

Transportation
The museum is accessible within walking distance South from Taipei Arena Station of Taipei Metro.

See also
 List of museums in Taiwan

References

External links

 

1967 establishments in Taiwan
Museums established in 1967
Museums in Taipei